The Copa do Brasil 1989 was the 1st staging of the Copa do Brasil.

The competition started on July 19, 1989, and concluded on September 2, 1989, with the second leg of the final, held at the Estádio Olímpico Monumental in Porto Alegre, in which Grêmio lifted the trophy for the first time with a 2-1 victory over Sport Recife.

Gérson, of Atlético Mineiro, with seven goals, was the competition's topscorer.

Format
The competition was disputed by 32 clubs in a knock-out format where all rounds were played in two legs and the away goals rule was used.

Participating teams

Competition stages

References
 Copa do Brasil 1989 at RSSSF

1989
1989 in Brazilian football
1989 domestic association football cups